Wadj can refer to:

 The Egyptian Pharaoh Djet.
 The Ancient Egyptian word for papyrus.
 An Ancient Egyptian hieroglyph, the papyrus stem.
 Wadj-wer, an ancient Egyptian god of fertility
 Wadj amulet, an Ancient Egyptian amulet in the shape of a papyrus stem
 WBHV (AM), a silent radio station (1330 AM) licensed to Somerset, Pennsylvania, United States, which held the call sign WADJ from 1980 to 1987